Gamblers' Ballet is a 2007 album by the Irish folk band Kíla.  It was nominated for the Choice Music Prize for Irish Album of the Year 2007.  The opening track "Leath Ina Dhiaidh A hOcht"/"Half Eight" was the first single taken from the album.  "Cardinal Knowledge" was used as the outro music for the Cartoon Saloon, Oscar nominated animation The Secret of Kells, and "Dúisigí" and "Cabhraigí Léi" were used in the Japanese film Kadokawa, which was directed by Ryuichi Hiroki.

Track listing 
 "Leath ina Dhiaidh a hOcht" – 3.18
 "Electric Landlady" – 4.47
 "Cardinal Knowledge" – 5.09
 "Dúisígí" – 3.39
 "Seo mo Leaba" – 4.09
 "Fir Bolg" – 5.32
 "Boy Racer" – 4.18
 "Her Royal Waggeldy Toes" – 4.06
 "Cabhraigí Léi" – 4.48

References

External links 
 Review by Harry Guerin, RTÉ.
 Kíla Gambles and Wins by Mike Farragher, Celtic Lounge, September 24, 2007
 Folk World Review by Tom Keller, Issue 34 11/2007.
 Review by Clare O'Brien, Subba Cultcha, February 2008
 Review of Single Leath Ina Dhiaidh a hOcht/Half Eight by Pete Whalley, Get Ready to Rock, February 2008
 Review of Gamblers' Ballet by Stephen Eddie, Die Shellsuit. Die!, April 2008

2007 albums
Kíla albums